Vangel Delev (born 12 March 1946) is a retired Bulgarian football midfielder.

References

1946 births
Living people
Bulgarian footballers
Botev Plovdiv players
Bulgaria international footballers
Association football midfielders